Schaal may refer to:

People 
David Schaal (actor) (born 1963), English actor
Richard Schaal (1928–2014), American actor
Wendy Schaal (born 1954), American actress, daughter of Richard
Kristen Schaal (born 1978), American comedian
Barbara A. Schaal (born 1947), American biologist
François Ignace Schaal (1747–1833), French general during the Revolutionary Wars and Napoleonic Wars
Paul Schaal (1943–2017), American baseball player
Stefan Schaal, American engineer

Place 
Schaal, Arkansas
Schaalsee, a lake in Germany

Other 
Johan Cruijff-schaal, a Dutch football trophy
Schaal (surname)